The 1995 European Judo Championships were the 6th edition of the European Judo Championships, and were held in Birmingham, England on 13 and 14 May 1995.

Medal overview

Men

Women

Medal table

Results overview

Men

60 kg

65 kg

71 kg

78 kg

86 kg

95 kg

+95 kg

Open class

Women

48 kg

52 kg

56 kg

61 kg

66 kg

72 kg

+72 kg

Open class

References

External links
 

E
Judo Championships
European Judo Championships
International sports competitions in Birmingham, West Midlands
Judo competitions in the United Kingdom
1990s in Birmingham, West Midlands
May 1995 sports events in the United Kingdom